The Ukrainians are the third-largest ethnic minority in Romania.  According to the 2011 Romanian census they number 51,703 people, making up 0.3% of the total population.  According to the 2021 Romanian census, there were 45,835 people who identified themselves officially as Ukrainians (0.24%), and 40,861 who declared that their language was Ukrainian. According to the 2021 Romanian census, there were 834 people (0.004% of the population) who identified themselves officially as Rusyns, and 594 who declared that their language was Rusyn. Ukrainians claim that the number is actually 250,000–300,000. Ukrainians mainly live in northern Romania, in areas close to the Ukrainian border. Over 60% of all Romanian Ukrainians live in Maramureș County (31,234), where they make up 6.77% of the population. According to the U.S. Census Bureau, in 2015, there were 345 ethnic Ukrainians born in Romania who lived in the United States of America at that time.

Sizable populations of Ukrainians are also found in Suceava County (5,698 people), Timiș County (5,953), Caraș-Severin County (2,600), Satu Mare County (1,397), Tulcea County (1,317), and Arad County (1,295). Ukrainians make up a majority in seven communes of Maramureș County (Bistra, Bocicoiu Mare, Poienile de sub Munte, Remeți, Repedea, Rona de Sus, and Ruscova) and three in Suceava County (Bălcăuți, Izvoarele Sucevei, and Ulma), as well as in Știuca, Timiș and Copăcele, Caraș-Severin. According to the 2002 census, 79% of Ukrainians were Eastern Orthodox, organized into the Ukrainian Orthodox Vicariate Sighetu Marmației; 10% Pentecostal; 2.8% Greek-Catholic, organized into the Ukrainian Greek-Catholic Vicariate Rădăuți; 2.1% Seventh-day Adventist; 1.2% Lipovan Orthodox and 2.9% stated they belonged to "another religion".

A second group of Ukrainians in Romania live in the Dobruja region of the Danube Delta. These are descendants of Zaporozhian Cossacks who fled Russian rule in the 18th century. In 1830, they numbered 1,095 families. Over the years they were joined by other peasants fleeing serfdom in the Russian Empire. In 1992, their descendants numbered four thousand people according to official Romanian statistics, while the local community claims to number 20,000. Known as Rusnaks, they continue to pursue the traditional Cossack lifestyle of hunting and fishing.

Other Ukrainians came under the policy of Romanianization following the collapse of Austria-Hungary over the whole of Bukovina and relinquishment of Russian Empire over Bessarabia in 1918; the Romanianization policies brought the closure of the Ukrainian public schools (all such schools were closed until 1928) and the suppression of most of the Ukrainian (Ruthenian) cultural institutions. The very term "Ukrainians" was prohibited from the official usage and some Romanians of disputable Ukrainian ethnicity were rather called the "citizens of Romania who forgot their native language" and were forced to change their last names to Romanian-sounding ones. Among those who were Romanianized were descendants of Romanians who were assimilated to Ukrainian society in the past. Among the latter were in turn the descendants of the Ukrainians who were Rumanized for centuries starting from the 14th century.

As an officially recognised ethnic minority, Ukrainians have one seat reserved in the Romanian Chamber of Deputies. Ștefan Tcaciuc held the seat from 1990 until his 2005 death, when he was replaced by Ștefan Buciuta. The Union of Ukrainians of Romania obtained 5,457 votes (0.09%) in the Chamber of Deputies election of 2020.

After 1989, a significant number of Ukrainian citizens (including ethnic Romanians/Moldovans from Ukraine) started immigrating to Romania (students, migrant workers, businesspeople, refugees). As of 2019, there are at least 18,000 Ukrainian-born people living in Romania, most of them living in large cities, such as Bucharest, Cluj-Napoca, or Timișoara.

Around 600,000 Ukrainians have fled to Romania since the start of the Russo-Ukrainian War.

Notable people
 Emil Bodnăraș - politician and army officer
 Ioan Dzițac - professor of mathematics and computer science
 Dmytro Hnatyuk - baritone opera singer
 Vasile Hutopilă - painter
 Mykhailo Mykhailyuk Ilkovych - poet, literary critic
 Simion Ismailciuc - sprint canoeist, won the Summer Olympics, two World Championships and three European Championships
 Olha Kobylianska - writer and feminist
 Anna Lesko - singer
 Ivan Pavlovich Maksimovich - Colonel of the UGA
 Miroslava Șandru - ethnographer and folklorist
 Antin Varivoda - Colonel of the UGA
 Nicodemus (Rusnak) - Ukrainian Orthodox metropolitan bishop of Kharkiv and Bohodukhiv

See also

 Ukrainian diaspora
 Danubian Sich
 Pokuttia-Bukovina dialect
 Romanians in Ukraine
 Moldovans in Ukraine
 Rusyns of Romania

References

External links
 Map of Ukrainian villages in Romania
 Article about the Ukrainians in Maramureș

Ethnic groups in Romania
Romania